Przemysław Mystkowski (born 25 April 1998) is a Polish professional footballer who plays as an attacking midfielder for Greek Super League 2 club Iraklis.

External links

References

1998 births
Living people
Sportspeople from Białystok
Polish footballers
Association football forwards
Jagiellonia Białystok players
Miedź Legnica players
Iraklis Thessaloniki F.C. players
Ekstraklasa players
I liga players
III liga players
Polish expatriate footballers
Expatriate footballers in Greece
Polish expatriate sportspeople in Greece